Gandempalle is a village in Y. Ramavaram Mandal, East Godavari district in the state of Andhra Pradesh in India.

Demographics 
At the 2011 India census, Gandempalle had a population of 46 (23 male and 23 female). 11% of the population were children below 6 years of age. The literacy rate was 17%.

References 

Villages in Y. Ramavaram mandal